To help compare different orders of magnitude, the following list describes various ampere levels.

References

External links

Current